Llanfairfechan railway station serves the town of Llanfairfechan, Wales, and is located on the Crewe to Holyhead North Wales Coast Line  west of Chester.

History
It was opened on 1 May 1860 by the London and North Western Railway, some twelve years after the line serving it. It was provided with a goods yard, signal box and a sizeable station building on the eastbound platform. A camping coach was positioned here by the London Midland Region from 1960 to 1964. Goods traffic ceased here in June 1964, but it remained open for passenger services. The station building was demolished in 1987, during construction work for the A55 North Wales Coast dual carriageway which runs next to the railway at this location - the site was also altered (the retaining wall for the road backs directly onto the eastbound platform) and the station temporarily closed as a consequence of this. The station reopened once the work was complete. The original station footbridge still stands, but the other surviving structures all date from the 1987 alterations.

Facilities
There are no permanent buildings left here now other than the footbridge and a stone shelter on each side, the station being unstaffed and a request stop. Tickets must be purchased from the guard on the train or prior to travel, as there is no ticket machine present. Train running details are offered via telephone, digital display screens or timetable poster boards. Though the footbridge has steps, the station is fully accessible for wheelchair or mobility-impaired users via ramps from the West Shore or the footpath from the town centre next to the A55.

Services

There are regular (two-hourly, with some extras) through services to Chester via Colwyn Bay, Prestatyn and Flint.

There is also a limited Sunday service, which mainly runs to/from Crewe.

References

Further reading

External links

 Photos of Station prior to and after the 1987 alterations

Llanfairfechan
Railway stations in Conwy County Borough
DfT Category F1 stations
Railway request stops in Great Britain
Former London and North Western Railway stations
Railway stations in Great Britain opened in 1860
Railway stations served by Transport for Wales Rail